Craig Santos Perez (born February 6, 1980) is a poet, essayist, university professor, American publisher (USA) from the Chamorro people, born in Mongmong-Toto-Maite, Guam Island.  His poetry has received multiple awards, including a 2015 American Book Award and the 2011 PEN Center USA Literary Award for Poetry.

Biography
Having grown up in a bilingual environment in Guam, Santos Perez moved with his family from Guam to California in 1995. He has stated in interview that "When my family migrated to California, and when I left my family to attend college, Chamorro became nearly non-existent in my life. Because poetry became a way for me to stay connected to memories of home, and a space where I could learn and write about my cultural history, the Chamorro language started to reappear in small ways. I do not have a formula for how this happens; it just happens intuitively. Though I have noticed that most of the Chamorro words that enter into my poetry are words from the natural word, or prayers. Still today, my poetry is written predominantly in English, but I hope that someday Chamorro will become a fuller part of my life and my poetry."

In 2011, together with Brandy Nālani McDougall, he co-founded the publishing house of Ala Press, specializing in the dissemination of literature and culture of the Pacific Islands. Craig Santos Perez is Professor of Pacific literature and creative writing at the University of Hawaiʻi at Mānoa.

Poetry
In 2008, he began the publication of his series of interconnected books, from unincorporated territory with the first book hacha. He has stated that part of the purpose of this series is to "create counter-mapping to subvert [colonial] maps."  Perez's poetry focuses on the themes of Pacific life, immigration to the US, the colonial history of the Pacific Islands and the various diasporas of Pacific Islanders.

As Michael Lujan Bevacqua says in a review essay for the academic journal Transmotion: "Perez seeks to turn the reader away from those mythical maps of modernity, whereby inclusion and assimilation lead to viability and universality. He seeks to push them in new directions not beset by those limiting politics of recognition. While his colonial citations challenge, he includes a number of native Chamorro citations as well, which change from conversations with his grandparents to discussions of Chamorro culture during different epochs. The Chamorro language often provides the basis for these alternative paths, like echoing sonar, leading us through layers of language and time." By contrast, Brandy Nālani McDougall in the Routledge Companion to Native American Literature emphasizes Perez's "diasporic experience as a Chamoru."

Poetry by Santos Perez was included in UPU, a curation of Pacific Island writers’ work which was first presented at the Silo Theatre as part of the Auckland Arts Festival in March 2020. UPU was remounted as part of the Kia Mau Festival in Wellington in June 2021.

Publications

Poetry
2023: from unincorporated territory [åmot], Omnidawn Publishing
2020: Habitat Threshold, Omnidawn Publishing.
2017: from unincorporated territory [lukao], Omnidawn Publishing
2014: from unincorporated territory [guma'], Omnidawn Publishing
2010: from unincorporated territory [saina], Omnidawn Publishing
2008: from unincorporated territory [hacha], Tinfish Press (reprinted by Omnidawn Publishing, 2017)
2007: Constellations gathered along the ecliptic, Shadowbox Press

In Anthology
2019: Native Voices: Indigenous American Poetry, Craft and Conversations. Eds. Cmarie Fuhrman and Dean Rader. Tupelo Press.
2018: Ghost Fishing: An Eco-Justice Poetry Anthology. Ed. Melissa Tuckey. University of Georgia Press.

Essays
2011, "Surviving Our Fallen: Chamorros, Militarism, Religiosity, and 9/11," Conversations at the Wartime Coffee: A Decade of War: 2001-2011, Ed. Sean Labrador y Manzano.
2011, "The Poetics of Mapping Diaspora, Navigating Culture, and Being From," Doveglion Literary Journal (online).
2011, "Signs of Being: Chamoru Poetry and Cecilia C. T. Perez," Jacket2 Magazine.
2011, "Whitewashing American Hybrid Aesthetics," The Monkey and the Wrench: Essays in Contemporary Poetics. Akron: U of Akron Press.
2011, "Why are White Editors So Mean?" Jacket2 Magazine.
2010, "Brandy Nālani McDougall's The Wind Salt / Ka Makani Pa'akai" (review), Studies in American Indian Literatures 22.3 (2010): 84-92.

Awards and distinctions
2022 MLA Prize in Native American Literature, Cultures, and Languages 
2020 ACLS Mellon/Scholars and Society Fellow
2017, The Elliot Cades Award for Literature
2016 Chancellor's Citation for Meritorious Teaching at the University of Hawaii 
2016, Lannan Foundation Literary Fellowship for Poetry 
2015, American Book Award 
2011, PEN Center USA Award
2011, The Los Angeles Times Book Prize
2010, The Poets & Writers California Writers Exchange Award
2009 Emily Chamberlain Cook Poetry Award from the University of Berkeley 
2008, Literary Prize for Poetry
2007, Eugene Cota-Robles Fellowship Scholarship, awarded by University of California, Berkeley
2001, The Jean Burden Poetry Award issued by the University of Redland

Articles and interviews
2019, "Poet to Poet Interview: Rajiv Mohabir and Craig Santos Perez, for Kenyon Review.
2017, "Love Poems in the Time of Climate Change," for New Republic, 248, no. 5001.
2016, "The Pacific Written Tradition," for the Cream City Review, v40 n118.
2015, "Transterritorial Currents and the Imperial Terripelago," for the American Quarterly, v67 n319.
2015, "Letters and a 12-Step Program," for the newspaper Amerasia, 41, no. 320.
2015, from "Understory," for the Colorado Review, v42 n221 (Summer) pp. 152–154.
2011, "The basic savagery of the White Poets Society," in Jacket2.
2010, ginen "AERIAL ROOTS", for the Iowa Review, v40 n223.
2009, "Picture Palace by Stephanie Young" (review), for the Colorado Review, v36 n324 (Fall/Winter) pp. 163–167.
2009, "Duende by Tracy K. Smith" (review), for the Colorado Review, v36 n125 (Spring) pp. 179–182.

References

1980 births
Living people
Guamanian people
Chamorro people
American Book Award winners